The politics of Jilin Province in the People's Republic of China is structured in a dual party-government system like all other governing institutions in mainland China.

The Governor of Jilin is the highest-ranking official in the People's Government of Jilin. However, in the province's dual party-government governing system, the Governor has less power than the Jilin Chinese Communist Party (CCP) Provincial Committee Secretary, colloquially termed the "Jilin CCP Party Chief".

Secretaries of the CCP Jilin Committee
Liu Xiwu: 1949－1952
Li Mengling: 1952－1955
Wu De: 1955－1966
Zhao Lin: 1966－1967
Wang Huaixiang: 1967－1977
Wang Enmao: 1977－1981
Qiang Xiaochu: 1981－1985
Gao Di: 1985－1988
He Zhukang: 1988－1995
Zhang Dejiang: 1995－1998
Wang Yunkun: 1998－2006
Wang Min: 2006－2009
Sun Zhengcai: 2009－2012
Wang Rulin: 2012－2014
Bayanqolu: 2014－2020
Jing Junhai: 2020 - incumbent

Governors of Jilin
Zhou Chiheng: 1950－1952
Li Youwen: 1952－1967
Wang Huaixiang: 1968－1977
Wang Enmao: 1977－1980
Yu Ke: 1980－1982
Zhang Gensheng: 1982－1983
Zhao Xiu: 1983－1985
Gao Dezhan: 1985－1987
He Zhukang: 1987－1989
Wang Zhongyu: 1989－1992
Gao Yan: 1992－1995
Wang Yunkun: 1995－1998
Hong Hu: 1998－2004
Wang Min: 2004－2006
Han Changfu: 2006－2009
Wang Rulin: 2009－2012
Bayanqolu: 2012－2014
Jiang Chaoliang: 2014－2016
Liu Guozhong: 2016－2018
Jing Junhai: 2018－2020
Han Jun: 2020－present

Chairmen of the Jilin People's Congress
Li Youwen 1980 - 1983
Yu Ke 1983 - 1985
Zhao Xiu 1985 - 1988
Huo Mingguang 1988 - 1993
He Zhukang 1993 -1998
Zhang Dejiang January 1998 - September 1998
Sang Fengwen September 1998 - March 1999
Wang Yunkun 1999 - 2009
Wang Min 2008 - 2009
Sun Zhengcai 2009 - 2012
Wang Rulin 2013 - 2014
Bayanqolu: 2014 - 2021
Jing Junhai: 2021 - incumbent

CPPCC Committee Chairmen of Jilin
Li Diping 1955 - 1977
Wang Enmao 1977 - 1980
Li Diping(re-elected) 1980 - 1985
Liu Jingzhi 1985 - 1988
Liu Yunzhao 1988 - 1998
Zhang Yueqi 1998 - 2003
Wang Guofa 2003 - 2011
Bayanqolu 2011 - 2013
Huang Yanming 2013 - 2018
Jiang Zelin 2018 - present

Jilin
Jilin